Raghuttama Tirtha (Sanskrit:रघूत्तम तीर्थ); IAST:Śrī Raghūttama Tīrtha) ( 1548 -  1596), was an Indian  philosopher, scholar,  theologian and saint. He was also known as Bhavabodhacharya. His diverse oeuvre include commentaries on the works of Madhva and Jayatirtha. He served as the fourteenth pontiff of Madhvacharya Peetha - Uttaradi Math from 1557 to 1595, which he occupied, with remarkable distinction for thirty-nine years. He is considered to be one of the most important seers in the history of Dvaita school of thought. His shrine at Tirukoilur attracts thousands of visitors every year.

Born in an aristocratic Brahmin family, but was brought up in mutt under the direction of Raghuvarya Tirtha. He composed 11 works, consisting of commentaries on the works of Madhva, Jayatirtha and Vyasatirtha in the form of Bhāvabodhas elaborating upon the Dvaita thought.

Life
Most of the information about Raghuttama Tirtha's life is derived from hagiography - Gurucaryā. He was born as Ramachandra Bhatta into Deshastha Madhva Brahmin family to Subba Bhatta and Gangabai in 1548. According to the hagiographies, his father was a Zamindar. The place of his birth is Mannur, Indi taluk, Bijapur district, Karnataka. According to the Gurucaryā, He had his Upanayana at the age of seven and immediately after Upanayana was ordained as a Sannyasa. Raghuttama Tirtha is said to have studied for some years after his ordinance, under a learned Pandit Adya Varadarajacharya of Manur under the direction of Raghuvarya Tirtha. According to the hagiographies, he was the nephew of Raghuvarya Tirtha- the thirteenth pontiff and succeeded his uncle in the pontificate of Uttaradi Matha and was also a close contemporary of Vijayindra Tirtha and Vadiraja Tirtha. Raghuttama Tirtha occupied the pontificate with remarkable distinction for thirty-nine years until he took Brindavana Pravesha in 1596. Raghuttama Swami took Brindavana on the bank of the river South Pennar in Mannampoondi near Tirukoilur. He was succeeded by his disciple Vedavyasa Tirtha.

Works
There have been 10 works accredited to Raghuttama Tirtha, 9 of which are commentaries on the works of Madhvacharya, Padmanabha Tirtha and Jayatirtha, out of which only five are published so far. Bhavabodha is the general title of a majority of his works and Raghuttama is usually called "Bhavabodhakara" or "Bhavabodhacharya". His work Brihadaranyaka Bhavabodha is a commentary on Madhva's Brihadaranyaka Upanishad Bhashya, is considered to be his magnum opus. Running up to 9,000 granthas, it discusses both Khandana and Bhashyartha of the Upanishad. His work Tattvaprakasika Bhavabodha is a super commentary on Jayatirtha's Tattvaprakāśikā. It is a voluminous gloss running to nearly 8100 granthas. It is quoted and criticized by Jagannatha Tirtha in his Bhashyadipika three to four times and by Raghavendra Tirtha once in his Tatparya Chandrika Prakasha.

Legacy
After Jayatirtha, Raghuttama Tirtha became Tika-kara and is usually referred to as Bhavabodhacharya. Sharma writes "His language is simple and precise. He makes his points forcefully. He quotes often from certain unidentified sources not cited by any other commentator". Raghuttama Tirtha is regarded as a saint known for preaching the worship of Lord Vishnu regardless of caste or creed. His shrine in Tirukoilur attracts thousands of visitors every year.

References

Bibliography

Further reading
Sri Raghuttama Tirtharu by Vyasanakere Prabhanjanacharya (Kannada text)
Tattvaprakasika Vyakhya Bhavabodhah (Sanskrit text)

External links
Works of Raghuttama Tirtha at Internet Archive
Sri Raghuttama Tirtha from https://www.uttaradimath.org
Sri Raghuttama Tirtha from http://www.tatvavada.org/eng/

16th-century Hindu philosophers and theologians
16th-century Indian philosophers
Indian Hindu saints
Madhva religious leaders
Vaishnavism
Dvaitin philosophers
Uttaradi Math
Bhakti movement
Hindu activists
Dvaita Vedanta
Scholars from Karnataka
1548 births
1595 deaths